This is a list of the mammal species recorded in Liberia. Of the mammal species in Liberia, nine are endangered, twelve are vulnerable, and eleven are near threatened.

The following tags are used to highlight each species' conservation status as assessed by the International Union for Conservation of Nature:

Order: Afrosoricida (tenrecs and golden moles) 

The order Afrosoricida contains the golden moles of southern Africa and the tenrecs of Madagascar and Africa, two families of small mammals that were traditionally part of the order Insectivora.

Family: Tenrecidae (tenrecs)
Subfamily: Potamogalinae
Genus: Micropotamogale
 Nimba otter shrew, Micropotamogale lamottei

Order: Hyracoidea (hyraxes) 

The hyraxes are any of four species of fairly small, thickset, herbivorous mammals in the order Hyracoidea. About the size of a domestic cat they are well-furred, with rounded bodies and a stumpy tail. They are native to Africa and the Middle East.

Family: Procaviidae (hyraxes)
Genus: Dendrohyrax
 Western tree hyrax, Dendrohyrax dorsalis

Order: Proboscidea (elephants) 

The elephants comprise three living species and are the largest living land animals.
Family: Elephantidae (elephants)
Genus: Loxodonta
African forest elephant, L. cyclotis

Order: Sirenia (manatees and dugongs) 

Sirenia is an order of fully aquatic, herbivorous mammals that inhabit rivers, estuaries, coastal marine waters, swamps, and marine wetlands. All four species are endangered.

Family: Trichechidae
Genus: Trichechus
 African manatee, Trichechus senegalensis

Order: Primates 

The order Primates contains humans and their closest relatives: lemurs, lorisoids, tarsiers, monkeys, and apes.

Suborder: Strepsirrhini
Infraorder: Lemuriformes
Superfamily: Lorisoidea
Family: Lorisidae (lorises, bushbabies)
Genus: Perodicticus
 Potto, Perodicticus potto 
Family: Galagidae
Genus: Galagoides
 Prince Demidoff's bushbaby, Galago demidovii 
Genus: Galago
 Senegal bushbaby, Galago senegalensis 
Suborder: Haplorhini
Infraorder: Simiiformes
Parvorder: Catarrhini
Superfamily: Cercopithecoidea
Family: Cercopithecidae (Old World monkeys)
Genus: Chlorocebus
 Green monkey, Chlorocebus sabaeus 
Genus: Cercopithecus
 Campbell's mona monkey, Cercopithecus campbelli 
 Diana monkey, Cercopithecus diana 
 Greater spot-nosed monkey, Cercopithecus nictitans 
 Lesser spot-nosed monkey, Cercopithecus petaurista 
Genus: Cercocebus
 Sooty mangabey, Cercocebus atys 
Subfamily: Colobinae
Genus: Colobus
 King colobus, Colobus polykomos 
Genus: Procolobus
 Western red colobus, Procolobus badius 
 Olive colobus, Procolobus verus 
Superfamily: Hominoidea
Family: Hominidae (great apes)
Subfamily: Homininae
Tribe: Panini
Genus: Pan
 Common chimpanzee, Pan troglodytes

Order: Rodentia (rodents) 

Rodents make up the largest order of mammals, with over 40% of mammalian species. They have two incisors in the upper and lower jaw which grow continually and must be kept short by gnawing.

Suborder: Hystricognathi
Family: Hystricidae (Old World porcupines)
Genus: Atherurus
 African brush-tailed porcupine, Atherurus africanus 
Genus: Hystrix
 Crested porcupine, Hystrix cristata 
Family: Thryonomyidae (cane rats)
Genus: Thryonomys
 Greater cane rat, Thryonomys swinderianus 
Suborder: Sciurognathi
Family: Anomaluridae
Subfamily: Anomalurinae
Genus: Anomalurus
 Lord Derby's scaly-tailed squirrel, Anomalurus derbianus 
 Pel's scaly-tailed squirrel, Anomalurus pelii 
Genus: Anomalurops
 Beecroft's scaly-tailed squirrel, Anomalurops beecrofti 
Subfamily: Zenkerellinae
Genus: Idiurus
 Long-eared flying mouse, Idiurus macrotis 
Family: Sciuridae (squirrels)
Subfamily: Xerinae
Tribe: Protoxerini
Genus: Epixerus
 Western palm squirrel, Epixerus ebii 
Genus: Funisciurus
 Fire-footed rope squirrel, Funisciurus pyrropus 
Genus: Heliosciurus
 Gambian sun squirrel, Heliosciurus gambianus 
 Small sun squirrel, Heliosciurus punctatus 
 Red-legged sun squirrel, Heliosciurus rufobrachium 
Genus: Paraxerus
 Green bush squirrel, Paraxerus poensis 
Genus: Protoxerus
 Slender-tailed squirrel, Protoxerus aubinnii 
 Forest giant squirrel, Protoxerus stangeri 
Family: Gliridae (dormice)
Subfamily: Graphiurinae
Genus: Graphiurus
 Jentink's dormouse, Graphiurus crassicaudatus 
 Lorrain dormouse, Graphiurus lorraineus 
 Nagtglas's African dormouse, Graphiurus nagtglasii 
Family: Nesomyidae
Subfamily: Dendromurinae
Genus: Dendromus
 Gray climbing mouse, Dendromus melanotis 
Subfamily: Cricetomyinae
Genus: Cricetomys
 Emin's pouched rat, Cricetomys emini 
Family: Muridae (mice, rats, voles, gerbils, hamsters, etc.)
Subfamily: Deomyinae
Genus: Lophuromys
 Rusty-bellied brush-furred rat, Lophuromys sikapusi 
Genus: Uranomys
 Rudd's mouse, Uranomys ruddi 
Subfamily: Murinae
Genus: Colomys
 African wading rat, Colomys goslingi 
Genus: Dasymys
 West African shaggy rat, Dasymys rufulus 
Genus: Dephomys
 Defua rat, Dephomys defua 
 Ivory Coast rat, Dephomys eburnea 
Genus: Grammomys
 Bunting's thicket rat, Grammomys buntingi 
 Shining thicket rat, Grammomys rutilans 
Genus: Hybomys
 Miller's striped mouse, Hybomys planifrons 
 Temminck's striped mouse, Hybomys trivirgatus 
Genus: Hylomyscus
 Allen's wood mouse, Hylomyscus alleni 
Genus: Lemniscomys
 Typical striped grass mouse, Lemniscomys striatus 
Genus: Malacomys
 Edward's swamp rat, Malacomys edwardsi 
Genus: Mastomys
 Guinea multimammate mouse, Mastomys erythroleucus 
Genus: Mus
 Peters's mouse, Mus setulosus 
Genus: Oenomys
 Ghana rufous-nosed rat, Oenomys ornatus 
Genus: Praomys
 Dalton's mouse, Praomys daltoni 
 Forest soft-furred mouse, Praomys rostratus 
 Tullberg's soft-furred mouse, Praomys tullbergi

Order: Soricomorpha (shrews, moles, and solenodons) 

The "shrew-forms" are insectivorous mammals. The shrews and solenodons closely resemble mice while the moles are stout-bodied burrowers.

Family: Soricidae (shrews)
Subfamily: Crocidurinae
Genus: Crocidura
 Buettikofer's shrew, Crocidura buettikoferi 
 Crosse's shrew, Crocidura crossei 
 Doucet's musk shrew, Crocidura douceti 
 Large-headed shrew, Crocidura grandiceps 
 Lamotte's shrew, Crocidura lamottei 
 West African long-tailed shrew, Crocidura muricauda 
 Nimba shrew, Crocidura nimbae 
 African giant shrew, Crocidura olivieri 
 Fraser's musk shrew, Crocidura poensis 
 Therese's shrew, Crocidura theresae 
Genus: Sylvisorex
 Climbing shrew, Sylvisorex megalura

Order: Chiroptera (bats) 

The bats' most distinguishing feature is that their forelimbs are developed as wings, making them the only mammals capable of flight. Bat species account for about 20% of all mammals.

Family: Pteropodidae (flying foxes, Old World fruit bats)
Subfamily: Pteropodinae
Genus: Eidolon
 Straw-coloured fruit bat, Eidolon helvum 
Genus: Epomophorus
 Gambian epauletted fruit bat, Epomophorus gambianus 
Genus: Epomops
 Buettikofer's epauletted fruit bat, Epomops buettikoferi 
Genus: Hypsignathus
 Hammer-headed bat, Hypsignathus monstrosus 
Genus: Lissonycteris
 Smith's fruit bat, Lissonycteris smithi 
Genus: Micropteropus
 Peters's dwarf epauletted fruit bat, Micropteropus pusillus 
Genus: Myonycteris
 Little collared fruit bat, Myonycteris torquata 
Genus: Nanonycteris
 Veldkamp's dwarf epauletted fruit bat, Nanonycteris veldkampi 
Genus: Rousettus
 Egyptian fruit bat, Rousettus aegyptiacus 
Genus: Scotonycteris
 Pohle's fruit bat, Scotonycteris ophiodon 
 Zenker's fruit bat, Scotonycteris zenkeri 
Subfamily: Macroglossinae
Genus: Megaloglossus
 Woermann's bat, Megaloglossus woermanni 
Family: Vespertilionidae
Subfamily: Kerivoulinae
Genus: Kerivoula
 Lesser woolly bat, Kerivoula lanosa 
 Spurrell's woolly bat, Kerivoula phalaena 
Subfamily: Myotinae
Genus: Myotis
 Rufous mouse-eared bat, Myotis bocagii 
 Cape hairy bat, Myotis tricolor 
Subfamily: Vespertilioninae
Genus: Glauconycteris
 Abo bat, Glauconycteris poensis 
Genus: Mimetillus
 Moloney's mimic bat, Mimetillus moloneyi 
Genus: Neoromicia
 Dark-brown serotine, Neoromicia brunneus 
 Cape serotine, Neoromicia capensis 
 Banana pipistrelle, Neoromicia nanus 
 Somali serotine, Neoromicia somalicus 
 White-winged serotine, Neoromicia tenuipinnis 
Genus: Pipistrellus
 Tiny pipistrelle, Pipistrellus nanulus 
Genus: Scotophilus
 African yellow bat, Scotophilus dinganii 
 Nut-colored yellow bat, Scotophilus nux 
Subfamily: Miniopterinae
Genus: Miniopterus
 Greater long-fingered bat, Miniopterus inflatus 
 Common bent-wing bat, Miniopterus schreibersii 
Family: Molossidae
Genus: Chaerephon
 Gland-tailed free-tailed bat, Chaerephon bemmeleni 
 Lappet-eared free-tailed bat, Chaerephon major 
Genus: Mops
 Sierra Leone free-tailed bat, Mops brachypterus 
 Spurrell's free-tailed bat, Mops spurrelli 
 Railer bat, Mops thersites 
Family: Emballonuridae
Genus: Saccolaimus
 Pel's pouched bat, Saccolaimus peli 
Family: Nycteridae
Genus: Nycteris
 Bate's slit-faced bat, Nycteris arge 
 Large slit-faced bat, Nycteris grandis 
 Hairy slit-faced bat, Nycteris hispida 
 Large-eared slit-faced bat, Nycteris macrotis 
 Ja slit-faced bat, Nycteris major 
Family: Rhinolophidae
Subfamily: Rhinolophinae
Genus: Rhinolophus
 Halcyon horseshoe bat, Rhinolophus alcyone 
 Rüppell's horseshoe bat, Rhinolophus fumigatus 
 Guinean horseshoe bat, Rhinolophus guineensis 
 Hill's horseshoe bat, Rhinolophus hillorum 
 Lander's horseshoe bat, Rhinolophus landeri 
 Bushveld horseshoe bat, Rhinolophus simulator 
 Ziama horseshoe bat, Rhinolophus ziama 
Subfamily: Hipposiderinae
Genus: Hipposideros
 Benito roundleaf bat, Hipposideros beatus 
 Cyclops roundleaf bat, Hipposideros cyclops 
 Sooty roundleaf bat, Hipposideros fuliginosus 
 Jones's roundleaf bat, Hipposideros jonesi 
 Aellen's roundleaf bat, Hipposideros marisae 
 Noack's roundleaf bat, Hipposideros ruber

Order: Pholidota (pangolins) 

The order Pholidota comprises the eight species of pangolin. Pangolins are anteaters and have the powerful claws, elongated snout and long tongue seen in the other unrelated anteater species.

Family: Manidae
Genus: Manis
 Giant pangolin, Manis gigantea 
 Long-tailed pangolin, Manis tetradactyla 
 Tree pangolin, Manis tricuspis

Order: Cetacea (whales) 

The order Cetacea includes whales, dolphins and porpoises. They are the mammals most fully adapted to aquatic life with a spindle-shaped nearly hairless body, protected by a thick layer of blubber, and forelimbs and tail modified to provide propulsion underwater.

Suborder: Mysticeti
Family: Balaenopteridae
Subfamily: Balaenopterinae
Genus: Balaenoptera
 Common minke whale, Balaenoptera acutorostrata 
 Sei whale, Balaenoptera borealis 
 Bryde's whale, Balaenoptera brydei 
 Blue whale, Balaenoptera musculus 
 Fin whale, Balaenoptera physalus 
Subfamily: Megapterinae
Genus: Megaptera
 Humpback whale, Megaptera novaeangliae 
Suborder: Odontoceti
Superfamily: Platanistoidea
Family: Phocoenidae
Genus: Phocoena
 Harbour porpoise, Phocoena phocoena 
Family: Physeteridae
Genus: Physeter
 Sperm whale, Physeter macrocephalus 
Family: Kogiidae
Genus: Kogia
 Pygmy sperm whale, Kogia breviceps 
 Dwarf sperm whale, Kogia sima 
Family: Ziphidae
Genus: Mesoplodon
 Blainville's beaked whale, Mesoplodon densirostris 
 Gervais' beaked whale, Mesoplodon europaeus 
Genus: Ziphius
 Cuvier's beaked whale, Ziphius cavirostris 
Family: Delphinidae (marine dolphins)
Genus: Orcinus
 Killer whale, Orcinus orca 
Genus: Feresa
 Pygmy killer whale, Feresa attenuata 
Genus: Pseudorca
 False killer whale, Pseudorca crassidens 
Genus: Delphinus
 Short-beaked common dolphin, Delphinus delphis 
Genus: Lagenodelphis
 Fraser's dolphin, Lagenodelphis hosei 
Genus: Stenella
 Pantropical spotted dolphin, Stenella attenuata 
 Clymene dolphin, Stenella clymene 
 Striped dolphin, Stenella coeruleoalba 
 Atlantic spotted dolphin, Stenella frontalis 
 Spinner dolphin, Stenella longirostris 
Genus: Steno
 Rough-toothed dolphin, Steno bredanensis 
Genus: Tursiops
 Common bottlenose dolphin, Tursiops truncatus 
Genus: Globicephala
 Short-finned pilot whale, Globicephala macrorhynchus 
Genus: Grampus
 Risso's dolphin, Grampus griseus 
Genus: Peponocephala
 Melon-headed whale, Peponocephala electra

Order: Carnivora (carnivorans) 

There are over 260 species of carnivorans, the majority of which feed primarily on meat. They have a characteristic skull shape and dentition.
Suborder: Feliformia
Family: Felidae (cats)
Subfamily: Felinae
Genus: Leptailurus
 Serval, L. serval 
Genus: Caracal
African golden cat, C. aurata 
Subfamily: Pantherinae
Genus: Panthera
 Leopard, P. pardus 
Family: Viverridae (civets, mongooses, etc.)
Subfamily: Viverrinae
Genus: Civettictis
 African civet, Civettictis civetta 
Genus: Genetta
 Johnston's genet, Genetta johnstoni 
Genus: Poiana
 Leighton's linsang, Poiana leightoni 
Family: Nandiniidae
Genus: Nandinia
 African palm civet, Nandinia binotata 
Family: Herpestidae (mongooses)
Genus: Atilax
 Marsh mongoose, Atilax paludinosus 
Genus: Crossarchus
 Common kusimanse, Crossarchus obscurus 
Genus: Herpestes
 Egyptian mongoose, Herpestes ichneumon 
Common slender mongoose, Herpestes sanguineus 
Genus: Liberiictis
 Liberian mongoose, Liberiictis kuhni 
Suborder: Caniformia
Family: Mustelidae (mustelids)
Genus: Mellivora
 Honey badger, Mellivora capensis 
Genus: Hydrictis
 Speckle-throated otter, H. maculicollis 
Genus: Aonyx
 African clawless otter, Aonyx capensis

Order: Artiodactyla (even-toed ungulates) 

The even-toed ungulates are ungulates whose weight is borne about equally by the third and fourth toes, rather than mostly or entirely by the third as in perissodactyls. There are about 220 artiodactyl species, including many that are of great economic importance to humans.

Family: Suidae (pigs)
Subfamily: Phacochoerinae
Genus: Phacochoerus
 Common warthog, Phacochoerus africanus 
Subfamily: Suinae
Genus: Hylochoerus
 Giant forest hog, Hylochoerus meinertzhageni 
Genus: Potamochoerus
 Red river hog, Potamochoerus porcus 
Family: Hippopotamidae (hippopotamuses)
Genus: Choeropsis
 Pygmy hippopotamus, Choeropsis liberiensis 
Genus: Hippopotamus
 Hippopotamus, Hippopotamus amphibius  extirpated
Family: Tragulidae
Genus: Hyemoschus
 Water chevrotain, Hyemoschus aquaticus 
Family: Bovidae (cattle, antelope, sheep, goats)
Subfamily: Antilopinae
Genus: Neotragus
 Royal antelope, Neotragus pygmaeus 
Subfamily: Bovinae
Genus: Syncerus
 African buffalo, Syncerus caffer 
Genus: Tragelaphus
 Bongo, Tragelaphus eurycerus 
 Bushbuck, Tragelaphus scriptus 
Subfamily: Cephalophinae
Genus: Cephalophus
 Bay duiker, Cephalophus dorsalis 
 Jentink's duiker, Cephalophus jentinki 
 Maxwell's duiker, Cephalophus maxwellii 
 Black duiker, Cephalophus niger 
 Ogilby's duiker, Cephalophus ogilbyi 
 Yellow-backed duiker, Cephalophus silvicultor 
 Zebra duiker, Cephalophus zebra

See also
 Wildlife of Liberia

Notes

References
 

Liberia
Liberia
Mammals
LIst